Mile voli disko is the second studio album by Yugoslav pop-folk singer Lepa Brena and her band Slatki Greh. It was released 18 November 1982 through the record label PGP-RTB.

This was her second of twelve albums with Slatki Greh.

Background 
Like the previous one, the tracks on the album were written by Milutin Popovic Zahar. Three hit singles on the album were "Mile voli disko", "Duge noge" and "Dama iz Londona". For the purpose of promoting the album, Brena and Slatki Greh appeared in the film A Tight Spot, in which Brena sang two songs. In addition to numerous witty scenes in the film, the most highlighted is when Srećko Šojić tells "Lepa Brena for four people".

The album was sold in a circulation of 780,000 copies.

Track listing

Personnel

Production and recording
Milutin Popović – arrangement
Petar Gaković – producer

Crew
Mića Isailović – photography

Release history

References

1982 albums
Lepa Brena albums
PGP-RTB albums
Serbo-Croatian language albums